Roger Kumble (born May 28, 1966) is an American film director, screenwriter, and playwright.

Life and career
Kumble was raised in Harrison, New York, and attended Harrison High School. He graduated from Northwestern University in 1988, where he wrote for the "Waa Mu" show.   He began his career as a playwright and director in 1993 with the Hollywood satire "Pay or Play", which garnered him the LA Weekly Theater Award for Best Comic Writing.  His second play, 1997's "d girl", starring David Schwimmer, earned him four Dramalogue Awards. In 2003, Kumble completed his Hollywood trilogy with the critically acclaimed "Turnaround", again starring David Schwimmer, which sold out its entire run in Los Angeles.  He returned to the theater in 2011 with his all female play "Girls Talk" starring Brooke Shields and Constance Zimmer.  Los Angeles Times critic Margaret Gray voted "Girls Talk" the best new play of 2011.

Kumble made his feature-film-directorial debut with 1999's Sony Pictures box-office hit, Cruel Intentions, starring Sarah Michelle Gellar, Ryan Phillippe, Reese Witherspoon and Selma Blair. His screenplay transposed the French novel Dangerous Liaisons to modern New York.  In 2015, Cruel Intentions: The '90s Musical was adapted from his film, and had an extended run off-Broadway.  

He followed with the Sony Pictures comedy The Sweetest Thing, starring Cameron Diaz, Christina Applegate, Jason Bateman and Thomas Jane, and New Line Cinema's Just Friends, starring Ryan Reynolds, Anna Faris and Amy Smart.  Both Sweetest Thing and Just Friends were voted two of the top twenty underrated films of the decade by the New York Post.

He also directed Martin Lawrence, Raven-Symoné and Donny Osmond in Disney's 2008 successful family-comedy College Road Trip. He followed that with 2010's Furry Vengeance, starring Brendan Fraser and Brooke Shields.

In the world of television he has directed episodes of Entourage, Suits, Pretty Little Liars, Revenge and The Goldbergs. In 2019, Kumble directed two films.  Netflix's Falling Inn Love starring Christina Milian and Adam Demos, followed by Voltage Picture's After We Collided. After We Collided was released in 2020 and became one of the biggest international box office successes of 2020.

Filmography

Theater Productions
"Pay or Play" (1993- Hudson Theater, Los Angeles)
"d girl"   (also directed by Kumble) (1997-Century City Playhouse, Los Angeles)
"Turnaround" (2003-Coast Playhouse, Los Angeles)
"Girls Talk" (2011-Lee Strasberg Theater - Los Angeles)

References

External links
 
"Cruel Intentions", Daily Script

1966 births
Living people
20th-century American dramatists and playwrights
American film directors
American male screenwriters
American television directors
American theatre directors
Northwestern University alumni
People from Harrison, New York
American male dramatists and playwrights
20th-century American male writers
Screenwriters from New York (state)
Comedy film directors